Erzelj is a village in the hills west of Vipava in the traditional Inner Carniola region of Slovenia. It is now generally regarded as part of the Slovenian Littoral. It was first mentioned in written documents dating to 1275.

Churches
There are two local churches in the settlement, belonging to the parish of Goče. Both are 15th-century buildings standing on Tabor Hill, and both were originally designed in the Gothic style and in the 18th century redesigned in the Baroque style. On the top of the hill stands St. Michael's Church, and at the foot of the hill stands St. Lawrence's Church.

Gallery

References

External links

Erzelj at Geopedia
Erzelj Local Community site

Populated places in the Municipality of Vipava